Lauri Taipalus (born January 14, 1988) is a Finnish professional ice hockey player who played with JYP Jyväskylä in the SM-liiga during the 2010-11 season. He played with SaiPa seasons 2012-14 and signed a contract with HIFK for next season.

References
http://www.eliteprospects.com/player.php?player=21251

External links

1988 births
Finnish ice hockey defencemen
JYP Jyväskylä players
Living people
People from Alavus
Sportspeople from South Ostrobothnia